"Love Me Like I Am" is a song by an Australian Christian pop duo For King & Country and Jordin Sparks. The original version of the song was initially released as the second promotional single from For King & Country's fifth studio album, What Are We Waiting For? (2022), on 18 February 2022. A new version of the song featuring Sparks impacted Christian radio on 31 August 2022, before finally releasing on 7 October 2022. The song was written by Joel Smallbone, Josh Kerr, Luke Smallbone, and Michael Pollack.

"Love Me Like I Am" peaked at No. 2 on the US Hot Christian Songs chart.

Background
On 18 February 2022, For King & Country released "Love Me Like I Am" as the second promotional single from What Are We Waiting For? (2022), accompanied with its music video. concurrently launching the album's pre-order. The song follows the release of 2021 singles "Relate" and "For God Is with Us" as well as the first promotional track, "Unsung Hero." Joel Smallbone shared the story behind the song, saying: 

On 27 August 2022, a new version of the song featuring Jordin Sparks exclusively premiered on K-Love radio. This version impacted Christian radio in the United States on 31 August 2022, before finally releasing on 7 October 2022.

Composition

Commercial performance
"Love Me Like I Am" debuted at number 38 on the US Hot Christian Songs chart dated 5 March 2022, concurrently charting at No. 4 on the Christian Digital Song Sales chart.

The version of "Love Me Like I Am" with Jordin Sparks debuted at No. 25 on the US Christian Airplay chart dated 10 September 2022,  and registered at No. 48 on the Hot Christian Songs chart that same week.

Music videos
The official music video for "Love Me Like I Am" was published on For King & Country's YouTube channel on 18 February 2022. The official lyric video for the song was uploaded on YouTube on 28 February 2022.

Charts

Weekly charts

Year-end charts

Release history

References

External links
 

2022 songs
For King & Country (band) songs
Jordin Sparks songs
Contemporary Christian songs
Songs written by Joel Smallbone
Songs written by Seth Mosley